Riccall railway station was a railway station which served the village of Riccall, north of Selby, on the East Coast Main Line. It was opened in 1871, closed to passengers in 1958 and then closed to goods services in 1964; the station building is now a private dwelling. In 1983 the Selby Diversion was opened which led to the closure of the railway line through Riccall; the former trackbed is now the route of the A19 around the village.

References

External links
 Information about Riccall and its station from British History
 Riccall station on navigable 1947 O. S. map

Railway stations in Great Britain opened in 1871
Railway stations in Great Britain closed in 1958
Disused railway stations in North Yorkshire
Former North Eastern Railway (UK) stations